Network programming may refer to one of several things:

 Computer network programming
 Scheduling broadcast programs